January 22 - Eastern Orthodox liturgical calendar - January 24

All fixed commemorations below are observed on February 5 by Eastern Orthodox Churches on the Old Calendar.

For January 23rd, Orthodox Churches on the Old Calendar commemorate the Saints listed on January 10.

Saints
 Hieromartyr Clement of Ancyra, Bishop of Ancyra, and Martyr Agathangelus (312)
 Saint Ascholius, Bishop of Thessaloniki (383)
 Venerable Eusebius, recluse of Mount Coryphe near Antioch (4th century)
 Venerable Salamanes the Silent (Salamanes the Hesychast), of the Euphrates, monk (ca. 400)
 Venerable Mausimas the Syrian, priest near Cyrrhus (before 423)
 Saint Paulinus the Merciful, Bishop of Nola (431)
 The Holy Two Martyrs of Parium, near Cyzicus and Lampsacus, in Asia Minor.

Pre-Schism Western saints
 Saint Emerentiana, a martyr in Rome (305)
 Saint Amasius of Teano, Bishop of Teano in central Italy (356)
 Saints Severian and Aquila, a husband and wife martyred in Julia Caesarea in Mauritania in North Africa.
 Saint Martyrius (Martory), a hermit in the Abruzzi in Italy (6th century)
 Saint Ormond (Armand), monk of the monastery of Saint Mairé in France, where he became abbot (6th century)
 Saint Ildefonsus, Metropolitan Bishop of Toledo from 657 (667)
 Saint Colman of Lismore, Abbot of Lismore Abbey in Ireland and also a bishop (702)
 Saint Lufthild, a saint honoured near Cologne in Germany, where she lived as an anchoress (ca. 850)
 Saint Maimbod (Mainboeuf), martyred by pagans while preaching to peasants near Kaltenbrunn in Alsace, now in France (ca. 880)

Post-Schism Orthodox saints
 Saint Dionysius of Olympus and Mt. Athos (1541)
 Venerable Gennadius of Kostroma, monk (1565)
 Venerable Alexander, Abbot of Voche, near Galich, in Kostroma Oblast (16th century)  (see also: March 27)

New martyrs and confessors
 New Hieromartyr Seraphim (Bulashov), Abbot of Holy Transfiguration Guslitsky Monastery (Moscow) (1938)
 New Hieromartyr Anatolius (Grisjuk) of Odessa, Bishop and Martyr (1938)
 Virgin-martyrs Evdokia and Ekaterine (1938)
 Virgin-martyr Militsa (1938)

Other commemorations
 Commemoration of the Holy Fathers of the Sixth Ecumenical Council (680-681)  (see also: September 14)
 Synaxis of the Saints of Kostroma.
 Translation of the relics (1786) of St. Theoctistus, Archbishop of Novgorod (1310)
 Repose of Abbot Damascene of Valaam Monastery (1881)
 Repose of Archimandrite John (Krestiankin) of the Pskov-Caves Monastery (2006)

Icon gallery

Notes

References

Sources
 January 23 / February 5. Orthodox Calendar (PRAVOSLAVIE.RU).
 February 5 / January 23. HOLY TRINITY RUSSIAN ORTHODOX CHURCH (A parish of the Patriarchate of Moscow).
 January 23. OCA - The Lives of the Saints.
 The Autonomous Orthodox Metropolia of Western Europe and the Americas (ROCOR). St. Hilarion Calendar of Saints for the year of our Lord 2004. St. Hilarion Press (Austin, TX). p. 9.
 January 23. Latin Saints of the Orthodox Patriarchate of Rome.
 The Roman Martyrology. Transl. by the Archbishop of Baltimore. Last Edition, According to the Copy Printed at Rome in 1914. Revised Edition, with the Imprimatur of His Eminence Cardinal Gibbons. Baltimore: John Murphy Company, 1916. pp. 23–24.
 Rev. Richard Stanton. A Menology of England and Wales, or, Brief Memorials of the Ancient British and English Saints Arranged According to the Calendar, Together with the Martyrs of the 16th and 17th Centuries. London: Burns & Oates, 1892. pp. 33–34.
Greek Sources
 Great Synaxaristes:  23 ΙΑΝΟΥΑΡΙΟΥ. ΜΕΓΑΣ ΣΥΝΑΞΑΡΙΣΤΗΣ.
  Συναξαριστής. 23 Ιανουαρίου. ECCLESIA.GR. (H ΕΚΚΛΗΣΙΑ ΤΗΣ ΕΛΛΑΔΟΣ). 
Russian Sources
  5 февраля (23 января). Православная Энциклопедия под редакцией Патриарха Московского и всея Руси Кирилла (электронная версия). (Orthodox Encyclopedia - Pravenc.ru).
  23 января (ст.ст.) 5 февраля 2013 (нов. ст.). Русская Православная Церковь Отдел внешних церковных связей. (DECR).

January in the Eastern Orthodox calendar